is a railway station on the Hakodate Main Line in Nishi-ku, Sapporo, Hokkaido, Japan, operated by the Hokkaido Railway Company (JR Hokkaido). It is numbered S03.

Lines
Kotoni Station is served by the Hakodate Main Line.

Station layout
The station consists of an elevated island platform serving two tracks. The station has automated ticket machines, automated turnstiles which accept Kitaca, and a "Midori no Madoguchi" staffed ticket office.

Platforms

Adjacent stations

Surrounding area
 Subway Kotoni Station (Tōzai Line)
 Kotoni Station Post Office
 Kotoni Nishi Police Station
 Tsuruha drug Kotoni-eki Higashi-guchi store
 Sapporo Agricultural Cooperative Association (JA Sapporo), Kotoni branch
 Hokkaido Bank, Hachi-ken branch
 Sapporo Shinkin Bank, Kotoni branch
 Sorachi Shinkin Bank, Kotoni branch
 Asahikawa Shinkin Bank, Kotoni branch
 North Pacific Bank, Kotoni branch

References

External links
 Kotoni JR Hokkaido map

Railway stations in Japan opened in 1880
Railway stations in Sapporo